Casric Stars F.C. are a South African football club based KwaMhlanga in Mpumalanga.

They currently play in the National First Division, after purchasing the status belonging to Free State Stars before the start of the 2022–23 National First Division.

History
The club were founded in 2012/13 as FC Palmeiras, and initially competed in the North West stream of the ABC Motsepe League. They changed their name to Casric F.C. during the 2017/18 season.

Honours 

 SAFA Second Division, North West Stream: 2018–19

References

External links
 

 
Soccer clubs in South Africa
National First Division clubs
Association football clubs established in 2012
2012 establishments in South Africa